The 26th ceremony of the Forqué Awards was held on 16 January 2021 at the Palacio Municipal de Congresos in Madrid. The gala, aired on La 1, was hosted by Miguel Ángel Muñoz and Aitana Sánchez-Gijón.

History 
The nominations were disclosed in November 2020. The awards added television categories (Best Series and Best Female and Male Performances in a Series) for the first time in the 26th edition.

The ceremony was hosted at the Madrid's Palacio Municipal de Congresos on 16 January 2021 and broadcast on La 1. It was hosted by Miguel Ángel Muñoz and Aitana Sánchez-Gijón.

The chairman of EGEDA, Enrique Cerezo, gifted the EGEDA Gold Medal recognizing a career in the audiovisual industry to Fernando Colomo and Beatriz de la Gándara.

Winners and nominees
The winners and nominees are listed as follows:

References

External links 
 Gala of the 26th Forqué Awards on RTVE Play

Forqué Awards
2021 film awards
2021 television awards
2021 in Madrid
January 2021 events in Spain